was a town located in Nakakanbara District, Niigata Prefecture, Japan.

As of 2003, the town had an estimated population of 32,386 and a density of 1,925.45 persons per km². The total area was 16.82 km².

On March 21, 2005, Kameda, along with the cities of Niitsu, Shirone and Toyosaka, the towns of Kosudo and Yokogoshi (all from Nakakanbara District), the town of Nishikawa, and the villages of Ajikata, Iwamuro, Katahigashi, Nakanokuchi and Tsukigata (all from Nishikanbara District), was merged into the expanded city of Niigata. As of April 1, 2007, the area is part of the Kōnan-ku ward.

See also
 Kōnan-ku, Niigata
 Niigata, Niigata
 Kameda Station

External links
 Niigata Kōnan-ku website 
 Welcome to Konan Ward - Niigata City 

Dissolved municipalities of Niigata Prefecture